Enakkul Oruvan can refer to two Tamil films:

 Enakkul Oruvan (1984 film), starring Kamal Haasan
 Enakkul Oruvan (2015 film), starring Siddharth